Anne Drysdale (26 August 1792 - 11 May 1853) was a pioneer squatter from whom Drysdale, Victoria, is named.

Early life
Anne Drysdale was born on 26 August 1792, the daughter of William Drysdale of Pitteuchar, Fife, Scotland, town clerk of Kirkcaldy, and Anne Currison, daughter of the town clerk of Hamilton.

Pioneer life

She initially had a farm in Ayrshire, Scotland, on her own account, and lived with the Houison Craufurd family in their Craufurdland Castle. Later decided, for health reasons, to emigrate to Port Phillip. Anne Drysdale arrived at Port Phillip on 15 March 1840, and soon after became a guest of Dr Alexander Thomson and his family in Geelong. He had offered to help her and find a run. She and Caroline Elizabeth Newcomb (1812-1874), also a recent immigrant, became friends and, when Anne decided on Boronggoop as the site for her run, they also became partners. Anne was an experienced farmer and twenty years senior to Caroline. A cottage was built for them, the Armstrong family and others entered their employ, and a home was established.

As Boronggoop was held by licence, Drysdale was anxious to own a freehold property. By 1843 they had established an outstation, Lap Lap, on Reedy Lake, and had heard of the run Coryule, near modern Drysdale. On 18 July they settled the sale of the property from Mr. Austin and by the late 1840s they were living there in the stone house Coryule, overlooking Port Phillip Bay, built by Melbourne architect, Charles Laing.

In June 1852, Anne Drysdale suffered a stroke and, after a period of invalidity, died on 11 May 1853. Newcomb inherited the property.

Newcomb died in 1874 and was buried beside Anne Drysdale at Coryule; their remains were later moved to the Geelong Eastern Cemetery.

Drysdale Circuit in the Canberra suburb of Kambah is named in her honour.

References

1792 births
1853 deaths
Scottish emigrants to colonial Australia
18th-century Australian women
19th-century Australian women